Linda Reinstein (December 28, 1955, San Diego, California) is the co-founder of the Asbestos Disease Awareness Organization (ADAO), a nonprofit focused on asbestos awareness and preventing related diseases through education, advocacy, and community efforts.

She became an activist after her husband, Alan, was diagnosed with mesothelioma in 2003. In 2004, she and Doug Larkin founded ADAO to reach out to those affected by asbestos-related diseases. Now serving as president and CEO, Reinstein has focused the power of social networks to unite those affected by asbestos-related diseases and those fighting for a ban on asbestos in the U.S. and worldwide. Since 2004, Reinstein has been a strong political voice for justice in every significant asbestos-related issue. She has frequently served as a U.S. Congressional witness. She has also presented persuasive testimony, presentations, and keynote speeches worldwide on the threat of asbestos to public health and the environment.

Global Presentations and U.S. Congressional Hearings 
Reinstein has presented hundreds of speeches, and keynote addresses focused on public health and environmental justice to audiences throughout the U.S., Amsterdam, Australia, Brazil, Canada, China, England, France, Germany, India, Italy, Japan, Mexico, Pakistan, Portugal, Singapore, South Africa, Thailand, The Netherlands, and Turkey. She has frequently served as a U.S. Congressional witness. She has also presented persuasive testimony, presentations, and keynote speeches across the world on the threat of asbestos to public health and the environment, including:

 U.S. Senate: Environmental and Public Works (EPW) Hearings June 2007 and July 2013 
 U.S. House of Representatives Hearings February 2008, September 2013, and May 2019
 U.S. Congressional Staff Briefings: 
 SENATE: January 2012 Senate Staff Briefing and July 2013 Senate Staff Briefing
 HOUSE of REPRESENTATIVES: June 2010 House Staff Briefing and July 2012 House Staff Briefing
 TEDx, Manhattan Beach, California, 2010
 United Nations World Congress on Safety and Health at Work (2011, 2014, 2017)
 International Mesothelioma Interest Group Amsterdam (2008), Kyoto (2010), South Africa (2014), and Ottawa (2018)
 American Public Health Association (2009, 2010, 2011, 2012, 2015, 2017)
 Global Health & Innovation Conference at Yale University,(2012, 2013, 2015, 2017, 2019)
 Annual Asbestos Disease Awareness Organization's International Asbestos Awareness and Prevention Conferences (2005-2019)

External links
 The Hill. "Advocate against asbestos." January 12, 2016
 Linda Reinstein on IMDb
 Linda Reinstein on PBS NewsHour

References

1955 births
Sustainability advocates
Asbestos
Living people